Plansinte is a village in the Tiburon  commune of the Chardonnières Arrondissement, in the Sud department of Haiti.

See also
Bon Pas
Carrefour Gros Chaudiere
Conete
Dalmate
Galette Sèche
Perion  
Tiburon

References

Populated places in Sud (department)